Anna  Margaretha Zwanziger (7 August 1760 – 17 September 1811) was a German serial killer. She used arsenic, which she referred to as "her truest friend".

From 1801 until 1811, Zwanziger was employed as a housekeeper at the home of several judges in Germany. She would poison her employers with arsenic, and then nurse them back to health to gain their favour. She poisoned three people, and attempted to poison several others She killed four people, one of whom was a baby.

Zwanziger was judged guilty of murder and sentenced to death. Before she was beheaded, she said it was probably a good thing she was to be executed, as she did not think she would be able to stop.

See also
 List of German serial killers

References

1760 births
1811 deaths
19th-century executions by Germany
19th-century German criminals
Criminals from Bavaria
Executed German female serial killers
Poisoners
People executed by Bavaria
People executed by Germany by decapitation
People from Nuremberg